Shao Ning (born 1982-02-17 in Shandong) is a male Chinese judoka who competed at the 2008 Summer Olympics in the Half heavyweight (90–100 kg) event.

Major performances
2007 Birmingham World Cup - 5th -90 kg class

See also
China at the 2008 Summer Olympics

References
http://2008teamchina.olympic.cn/index.php/personview/personsen/5190

1982 births
Living people
Judoka at the 2008 Summer Olympics
Olympic judoka of China
Sportspeople from Shandong
Judoka at the 2010 Asian Games
Chinese male judoka
Asian Games competitors for China
21st-century Chinese people